Wheeling Creek is a tributary of the Ohio River,  long, in the Northern Panhandle of West Virginia in the United States, with a watershed extending into southwestern Pennsylvania. It flows into the Ohio River in downtown Wheeling, just downstream of Ohio's Wheeling Creek on the opposite bank. A variant name is Big Wheeling Creek. According to the French explorer Pierre Joseph Céloron de Blainville, the native name of the stream is the Kanououara River, as was inscribed on the lead plate buried at the mouth by the Ohio River in 1749.

Geography

Wheeling Creek is formed in northeastern Marshall County, West Virginia, by the confluence of streams known as the Enlow Fork and the Dunkard Fork:

Enlow Fork, also known historically as "Enslow Fork," rises in Pennsylvania on the boundary of Greene and Washington Counties, and flows west-southwestwardly along that boundary into Marshall County. Enlow Fork defines the northern boundaries of Morris, Gray, and Richhill Townships in Greene County; and the southern boundaries of Morris, East Finley, and West Finley townships in Washington County.
Dunkard Fork, also known historically as "Crow Creek," is formed in Pennsylvania by the confluence of the North Fork Dunkard Fork and the South Fork Dunkard Fork in Richhill Township in Greene County, and flows northwestwardly into Marshall County. Its north and south forks each flow northwestwardly into Richhill Township; the North Fork rises in Jackson Township and flows through Ryerson Station State Park, where it is dammed to form a lake; and the South Fork rises in Aleppo Township.

From the confluence of the Dunkard and Enlow forks, Wheeling Creek flows northwestwardly into the city of Wheeling in Ohio County. In the Elm Grove neighborhood of Wheeling, it collects Little Wheeling Creek, which rises in Ohio County just west of the Pennsylvania state line and flows southwestwardly through the communities of Valley Grove and Triadelphia. In Triadelphia, Little Wheeling Creek collects Middle Wheeling Creek, which rises in West Finley Township in Greene County, Pennsylvania, and flows generally westwardly into southeastern Ohio County.

According to the West Virginia Department of Environmental Protection, of the  drained by Wheeling Creek in West Virginia, approximately 67% is forested; approximately 27% is used for agriculture; and approximately 5% is urban.

Discharge
Between 1941 and 2005, the annual mean flow of the creek at the gauge was 343 cubic feet per second (9.7 m³/s). The creek's highest flow during the period was estimated at 22,300 ft³/s (632 m³/s) on September 17, 2004. The lowest recorded flow was 0.1 ft³/s (0 m³/s) on October 7, 1963, and on two days in September 1964.

Fishing
Wheeling Creek is a popular fishing destination to those close to it. There are many entry points located alongside the Wheeling Heritage Trail System. There are a variety of fish species including muskellunge, smallmouth bass, sunfish, hognose suckers, various species of catfish, and bluegill. Wheeling Creek is also regularly stocked with rainbow trout and brown trout.

See also
List of tributaries of Wheeling Creek
Elm Grove Stone Arch Bridge
Fisher site — archeological site along Enlow Fork.
List of West Virginia rivers

References

External links 

USGS real-time water data for Wheeling Creek at Elm Grove
USGS real-time water data for Dunkard Fork near Majorsville
stocking information

Rivers of West Virginia
Tributaries of the Ohio River
Rivers of Marshall County, West Virginia
Rivers of Ohio County, West Virginia
Geography of Wheeling, West Virginia